The 2010 Mnet Asian Music Awards was the twelfth of the annual music awards in Seoul, South Korea that took place on November 28, 2010, at The Venetian Macao in Macau, China. About 10,000 people attended the awards ceremony.

The ceremony was the first Mnet Asian Music Awards to occur outside of South Korea. 2NE1 took home four awards, the most of the night, including Artist of the Year and Album of the Year. 2PM took home three including the Shilla Duty Free Asian Wave Special Award, as well as rookie group Miss A won Song of the Year for "Bad Girl Good Girl". In total, there were thirty two awards, including awards not given out during broadcast.

Background
The event marked the twelfth of the annual music awards. With its slogan "One Asia", MAMA was broadcast live in China, Japan, Hong Kong and Southeast Asia through various channels, as well as in the US and Canada.

Artists Taeyang, DJ Doc, Gummy, Rain, Hot Potato, Far East Movement, Perfume, I Me, and Chemistry all won awards during the televised broadcast. A VTR of international artists congratulating the event was also shown including Lam Tun, Ho Gu Hua, Hong Ying, Pam Tan, Keri Hilson, and will.i.am. CNBLUE, 2AM, Jo Kwon, Ga-In who also won awards, however, were not broadcast due to lack of attendance.

Performances
The following individuals and groups, listed in order of appearance, performed musical numbers at the ceremony.

Presenters

 2NE1 – presented Best New Female Artist
 Miss Korea's Jung So-ra, Chang Hyung-jin, Ha Yun-jong – presented Best Dance Performance by a Male Group
 Eugene – presented Best New Asian Artist Award
 Woo Man-so – presented Best Digital Single
 John Park, Jang Jae-in, Kang Seung-Yoon – introduced presenter Zhang Jie
 Son Ho (손호영) and Kim Jung-min (김정민) – presented Asian Pop Artist
 Kim Jongju and Choo Hyunhee – presented Best Female Group
 Miss A – introduced presenters I Me and Perfume
 Cho Yeo-jeong – presented Best Male Solo Artist
 Yoon Jong-shin and Seo Hyo-rim – presented Best Rap Performance
 Song Joong-ki – presented Best Solo Vocal Performance and Best Asian Artist
 Oh Ji-ho and So Yoo-jin – presented Best Male Group and Best Solo Dance Performance
 UV – presented Best Band Performance
 Kim Dong-wook – presented Best Dance Performance by a Female Group
 Lam Tun, Ho Gu Hua, Hong Ying, Pam Tan, Keri Hilson, will.i.am – VTR Greetings
 Ok Taecyeon, Nichkhun, Song Jong-min – presented Best International Artist
 Yoon Jong-shin – introduced Huh Gak
 Kim Jung-eun – speech
 Kim Kang-woo – presented Best R&B Asian Artist
 Hanni and Shilla Duty Free CEO – presented The Shilla Duty Free Asian Wave Award
 Jun Jeong Myeong and Kim Hyun Jung – presented Best Music Video
 Joo Jin-mo – presented Artist of the Year
 Yoon Eun-hye – presented Album of the Year
 Hong Jongmin and Kim Jung-eun – presented Song of the Year

Winners and nominees

Winners are listed first and highlighted in boldface.

Special awards
 Best New Asian Artist Award: I Me – "Aiayiya"
 Asian Pop Artist: Perfume – "Chocolate Disco"
 Best Asian Artist: Jason Zhang – "It's Love"
 Best R&B Asian Artist: Chemistry –  "Pieces Of Dream"
 Best International Artist: Far East Movement – "Like a G6"
 Choreographer Award: Kim Hwa-young
 Producer Award: Psy
 Adult Music Award: Tae Jin-ah
 Stylist Award: Yang Seung-ho
 Performance Award: Jisan Valley Rock Festival

Multiple awards

Artist(s) with multiple wins
The following artist(s) received two or more wins (excluding the special awards):

Artist(s) with multiple nominations
The following artist(s) received more than two nominations:

Controversy

SM Entertainment boycott
SM Entertainment, one of the largest Korean music agencies, boycotted the 2010 Mnet Asian Music Awards, as they did in 2009. The show was under fire for fairness and employing a "no show, no award" policy where the winner must attend the ceremonies.

Location
In addition, Mnet came under criticism because of the date and location of the awards. They were the first Mnet Asian Music Awards to take place outside of South Korea. They also aired on a Sunday, which means performers had to choose between SBS' The Music Trend show or the awards ceremony.

References

External links
 Mnet Asian Music Awards  official website

MAMA Awards ceremonies
Mnet Km Music Festival
Mnet Km Music Festival
Mnet Km Music Festival
Mnet Km Music Festival